The Tuam Herald is a weekly Irish newspaper, founded in 1837 by Richard Kelly, which serves the town of Tuam and County Galway. It has a circulation of about 10,000 copies.

The newspaper is printed (but not owned) by Celtic Media Group.

People
 Billy Coss
 David Connors
 Mark walsh
 Siobhan Holliman

References

1837 establishments in Ireland
Mass media in County Galway
Newspapers published in the Republic of Ireland
Publications established in 1837
Herald
Weekly newspapers published in Ireland